Zeynu Ummer (born 20 October 1972) is an Ethiopian diplomat and statesman who is the current Team Lead and Senior Chief Technical Adviser for the UNDP Africa Borderlands Centre based in Nairobi, Kenya. Before joining the United Nations, he was a State Minister for Peace in Ethiopia, Commissioner General of the Ethiopian Police, and Head of the Ethiopian Refugee Agency.

Early life and education

Zeynu Jemal Ummer was born in Cheha, Ethiopia. He attended Gubre Junior Secondary School, Ethiopia between 1981-1986 and Goro Comprehensive Senior Secondary School between 1987 and 1991. He thereafter proceeded to the College of Natural Science, University of Addis Ababa where he obtained a B.Sc. in physics. Zeynu has a Master of Business Administration (MBA), Specialization in Strategic Management, School of Business, University of Nairobi and PhD in Political Economy from the University of Switzerland. He is fluent in Amharic and English.

Career

Diplomat
Zeynu served as a diplomat in Ethiopia and Kenya for more than 10 years. As a senior diplomat with the Ethiopian Embassy in Nairobi, Kenya,  he managed bilateral level and multilateral cooperation on issues of conflict resolution, regional economic integration, political issues, counter terrorism and other transnational crime prevention for the government of Ethiopia. 

Between October 2018 and November 2019, he served as State Minister of Peace, where he was in charge of developing strategies and coordinating national efforts to enforce the rule of law, manage conflicts, and build peace in Ethiopia. Before that, he was the Commissioner General of Police in Ethiopia, between June - October 2018 and managed a critical period in Ethiopia's transition from a repressive regime to democracy. He was responsible for handling transition related chaotic situations, leading Ethiopia's efforts to enforce the rule of law and prevent organized national and trans-border crimes. His tenure saw the initiation of several police reform programs in Ethiopia.

A veteran in Ethiopia's public service, Zeynu served as deputy director of the Administration for Refugee and Returnee Affairs (ARRA) with responsibility for leading one of the world's largest refugee operations, hosting over a million refugees originating from over 20 countries in Africa and the Middle East with an annual budget of over 50 million US dollars and over 3500 staff. The current refugee law in Ethiopia is one of the best refugee law in the world, and this is the contribution of Zeynu Ummer, who drafted the law and convinced the parliament to approve it. He also led the design of a 10-year strategy on self-reliance of refugees and uplifting socio-economic situation of refugees.

United Nations
Zeynu Ummer joined UNDP in 2019 to design and launch the Africa Borderlands Centre in close consultation with the African Union, regional economic communities in Africa, development partners, UNDP country offices and other UN agencies.

References

1972 births
Living people
United Nations diplomats
Ethiopian diplomats
University of Nairobi alumni